

Days of the month

30 November 2008 (Sunday)

American football
National Football League Week 13:
Baltimore Ravens 34, Cincinnati Bengals 3
Carolina Panthers 35, Green Bay Packers 31
Indianapolis Colts 10, Cleveland Browns 6
The Colts win keeps them in contention for the AFC South Division title.
Miami Dolphins 16, St. Louis Rams 12
Tampa Bay Buccaneers 23, New Orleans Saints 20
New York Giants 27, Washington Redskins 7
The Giants improve to 11–1, and need one more win or a Dallas loss to clinch the NFC East Division title.
San Francisco 49ers 10, Buffalo Bills 3
The 49ers become the first west coast team this season to win in an east coast hosted contest, and stay in contention for the NFC West Division title.
Atlanta Falcons 22, San Diego Chargers 16
Denver Broncos 34, New York Jets 17
Kansas City Chiefs 20, Oakland Raiders 13
Pittsburgh Steelers 33, New England Patriots 10
Minnesota Vikings 34, Chicago Bears 14
NCAA BCS Ranking:
As a result of the new ranking, Oklahoma, who climbs to second place at the expense of Texas, who drop to third, will represent the Big 12 South Division in the Conference Championship Game against Missouri on Saturday in Kansas City. The Sooners are tied with the Longhorns and Texas Tech in the Division standing, and according to the Conference tiebreaker rules the BCS ranking determines the Division winner. The other places in the top ten are unchanged: Alabama, that finished the regular season with perfect 12–0 record remains on top, Florida, who will play against the Crimson Tide in the SEC Championship Game stays in fourth place, and Southern California, that need a win over UCLA to clinch the Pac-10 Championship round out the top five. They are followed by Utah, Texas Tech, Penn State, Boise State and Ohio State.

Cricket
New Zealand in Australia:
2nd Test in Adelaide, day 3:
 270 & 35/0;  535. New Zealand trail by 230 runs with all 10 wickets remaining in the 2nd innings.
Sri Lanka in Zimbabwe:
5th ODI in Harare:
 152 (48.5 overs) def.  133 (44 overs) by 19 runs. Sri Lanka sweep the series 5–0

Football (soccer)
U-20 Women's World Cup in Chile:
Quarterfinals:
 2–3 
Nora Coton-Pélagie scores the winning goal for France with 2 minutes remaining.
 3–0 
Two goals by Sydney Leroux lift USA to the semifinal for the fourth time in a row.

Golf
European Tour:
Australian Masters at Huntingdale Golf Club, South Oakleigh, Victoria, Australia:
Winner:  Rod Pampling 276 (−12)PO
Unofficial events:
Mission Hills World Cup at Mission Hills Golf Club, Shenzhen, China:
(1)  (Robert Karlsson & Henrik Stenson) (2)  (Miguel Ángel Jiménez & Pablo Larrazábal) (3)  (Richard Green & Brendan Jones) &  (Ryuji Imada & Toru Taniguchi)
Lexus Cup in Singapore:
International team 12½–11½ Asia
LG Skins Game in Indian Wells, California:
K. J. Choi  wins six skins and $415,000 to claim the title.

Winter sports

Alpine skiing
Men's World Cup in Lake Louise, Canada:
Super giant slalom: (1) Hermann Maier  1min 29.84sec, (2) John Kucera  1:30.43, (3) Didier Cuche  1:30.52,
Women's World Cup in Aspen, United States:
Slalom: (1) Šárka Záhrobská  1:39.32 (2) Nicole Hosp  1:39.55 (3) Tanja Poutiainen  1:40.29

Bobsleigh
World Cup in Winterberg, Germany:
Four-man: (1)  1:49.30 (2)  1:49.63 (3)  1:49.82

Cross-country skiing
World Cup in Kuusamo, Finland
Men 15 km classic: (1) Martin Johnsrud Sundby  37:52.5, (2) Lukáš Bauer  at 3.5 secs, (3) Sami Jauhojärvi  14.1,
Women 10 km classic: (1) Aino-Kaisa Saarinen  28:16.4, (2) Virpi Kuitunen  at 3.8secs, (3) Marit Bjørgen  7.3,

Figure skating
Grand Prix:
NHK Trophy in Tokyo, Japan:
Men: (1) Nobunari Oda  236.18 (2) Johnny Weir  224.42 (3) Yannick Ponsero  217.24
Grand Prix Final qualifiers: (1) Patrick Chan  (2). Takahiko Kozuka  (3) Johnny Weir  4. Brian Joubert  5. Jeremy Abbott  6. Tomáš Verner

Luge
World Cup in Innsbruck–Igls, Austria:
Men's: (1) Andi Langenhan  (2) David Möller  (3) Armin Zöggeler 
Women's: (1) Tatjana Hüfner  (2) Natalie Geisenberger  (3) Anke Wischnewski

Nordic combined
World Cup in Kuusamo, Finland:(place after jump in parentheses)
10 km Gundersen: (1) Anssi Koivuranta  27:33.2 (3rd), (2) Janne Ryynänen  at 48.6 secs (2nd), (3) Daito Takahashi  1:01.3 (1st)

Short track speed skating
World Cup 3 in Beijing, China:
Ladies' 500m (2): (1) Liu Qiuhong  43.590 (2) Fu Tian Yu  43.617 (3) Zhao Nannan  43.749
Men's 500m (2): (1) Olivier Jean  41.482 (2) Sung Si-Bak  41.673 (3) Sui Bao Ku  41.727
Ladies' 1000m: (1) Wang Meng  1:30.028 (2) Zhou Yang  1:30.117 (3) Shin Sae-Bom  1:30.389
Men's 1000m: (1) Lee Ho-Suk  1:29.710 (2) Kwak Yoon-Gy  1:29.785 (3) Charles Hamelin  1:30.007
Ladies' 3000m relay: (1)  4:07.804 (2)  4:08.230 (3)  4:13.666
Men's 5000m relay: (1)  6:47.432 (2)  6:47.484 (3)  6:47.676

29 November 2008 (Saturday)

American college football
NCAA BCS Top 10:
The Iron Bowl: (1) Alabama 36, Auburn 0
The Crimson Tide's win makes them the fourth Division I FBS team, and the only one from a BCS conference, with a perfect 12–0 regular season. The other perfect teams are Utah, Boise State and Ball State.
The Bedlam Series: (3) Oklahoma 61, (12) Oklahoma State 41
The Sooners victory, combined with Texas Tech's win over Baylor, keeps them in contention for the Big 12 South Division title.
Sunshine Showdown: (4) Florida 45, (20) Florida State 15
The win for the SEC Championship Game bound Gators keeps them on the inside track for BCS at-large bid. The Seminoles were also disappointed that Boston College beat Maryland and clinched the ACC Atlantic Division title.
(5) Southern California 38, Notre Dame 3
The Trojans dominated against the Fighting Irish and now must beat arch rival UCLA next Saturday to secure the Pac-10 title and the Rose Bowl berth.
(7) Texas Tech 35, Baylor 28
The Red Raiders come back from a 14-points third-quarter deficit to win, but Oklahoma's win will likely leave then in 3rd place in the Big 12 South and out of the BCS bowls.
Top Ten teams whose regular seasons completed: (6) Utah, (8) Penn State,  (10) Ohio State. (2) Texas completed their season Thursday, and (9) Boise State finished their season on Friday.
Notable Rivalry Games:
Clean, Old-Fashioned Hate: Georgia Tech 45, (11) Georgia 42
The Yellow Jackets come back from 16-points half-time deficit with 26–0 run in the third quarter, but their joy for the win is mixed with disappointment as win for Virginia Tech means the Hokies win the ACC Coastal Division title at the expense of Georgia Tech. The Bulldogs loss ends their hopes for BCS at-large bid.
Border Showdown: Kansas 40, (13) Missouri 37 at Kansas City
The Jayhawks lead by 16 points early in the third quarter, then allow the Tigers to score 20 consecutive points to take the lead, but Kerry Meier catches a 15-yard pass and scores with 27 seconds remaining to give Kansas the victory over the Big 12 North Division winner. The Tigers will likely drop off the top-14 in the next BCS ranking and be out of contention for BCS at-large berth if they lose the championship game next Saturday.
The Civil War: (23) Oregon 65, (17) Oregon State 38
The Beavers, who could have clinched the Pac-10 championship with a win, now should hope for a Southern California loss to UCLA next Saturday to win the title. If the Trojans win, They will make the short trip to Pasadena for the fourth consecutive year.
Battle of the Palmetto State: Clemson 31, South Carolina 14.
Clemson becomes bowl eligible with the win against their in-state rival.
Commonwealth Cup: Virginia Tech 17, Virginia 14
The Hokies win gives them the ACC Coastal Division title and a trip to the Championship Game against Boston College.
Bayou Bucket Classic: Rice 56, Houston 42.
The Owls win is worthless since Tulsa beat Marshall and claims the C-USA West Division championship.
Victory Bell: North Carolina 28, Duke 20
Other notable games:
(21) Boston College 28, Maryland 21
The Eagles win gives them the ACC Atlantic Division title and a spot in the ACC Championship Game against Virginia Tech next Saturday in Tampa.
Tulsa 38, Marshall 35
The Golden Hurricane's win combined with Rice's victory over Houston gives them home field for the C-USA Championship Game against East Carolina next week.
News off the field:
Sylvester Croom, the first African-American head coach in the SEC, resigned at Mississippi State.

Cricket
New Zealand in Australia:
2nd Test in Adelaide, day 2:
 270;  241/3. Australia trail by 29 runs with 7 wickets remaining in the 1st innings.

Rugby union
End of year tests:
 6–32  in London
The All Blacks complete a 5–0 perfect record in the autumn tests, and also complete their third successful Grand Slam tour, defeating all of the Home Nations.
 21–18  in Cardiff
The Wallabies lose their first match in the European tour, while Wales score its first win after losses to South Africa and New Zealand.
As a result of England's loss and Wales' narrow win, Argentina held on to 4th place in the IRB World Rankings, placing the Pumas in the top seeding pot at the draw for 2011 World Cup, alongside New Zealand, South Africa and Australia. England, Wales, France and Ireland will be in the second pot, Scotland, Italy, Fiji and Tonga in the third pot.
Sevens World Series:
Dubai Sevens in Dubai:
Cup Final:  12–19

Winter sports

Alpine skiing
Men's World Cup in Lake Louise, Canada:
Downhill: (1) Peter Fill  (2) Carlo Janka  (3) Hans Olsson 
Women's World Cup in Aspen, United States:
Giant slalom: (1) Tessa Worley  (2) Tanja Poutiainen  (3) Elisabeth Görgl

Bobsleigh
World Cup in Winterberg, Germany:
Two-man: (1) Beat Hefti/Thomas Lamparter  1:51.79 (2) André Lange / Kevin Kuske  1:51.96 (3) Thomas Florschuetz / Marc Kuhne  1:52.09
Two-woman: (1) Helen Upperton / Jennifer Ciochetti  1:55.86  Sandra Kiriasis / Romy Logsch  1:56.11 (3) Cathleen Martini / Janine Tischer  1:56.39

Cross-country skiing
World Cup in Kuusamo, Finland:
Men's sprint classic: (1) Ola Vigen Hattestad , (2) Tor Arne Hetland , (3) John Kristian Dahl 
Women's sprint classic: (1) Petra Majdič , (2) Lina Andersson , (3) Justyna Kowalczyk

Figure skating
Grand Prix:
NHK Trophy in Tokyo, Japan:(skaters in bold qualify to Grand Prix Final)
Ladies: (1) Mao Asada  191.13 (2) Akiko Suzuki  167.64 (3) Yukari Nakano  166.87
Final standing: (1) Kim Yuna  (2) Joannie Rochette  (3) Asada  4 Carolina Kostner  5 Nakano  6 Miki Ando 
Pairs: (1) Pang Qing / Tong Jian  186.06 (2) Rena Inoue / John Baldwin  161.49 (3) Jessica Dubé / Bryce Davison  156.76
Final standing: (1) Aliona Savchenko / Robin Szolkowy  (2) Zhang Dan / Zhang Hao  (3) Yuko Kawaguchi / Alexander Smirnov  4 Pang / Tong  5 Tatiana Volosozhar / Stanislav Morozov  6 Maria Mukhortova / Maxim Trankov 
Ice dancing: (1) Federica Faiella / Massimo Scali  176.67 (2) Nathalie Péchalat / Fabian Bourzat  175.42 (3) Emily Samuelson / Evan Bates  161.45
Final standing: (1) Isabelle Delobel / Olivier Schoenfelder  (2) Oksana Domnina / Maxim Shabalin  (3) Faiella / Scali  4 Jana Khokhlova / Sergei Novitski  5 Meryl Davis / Charlie White  6 Tanith Belbin / Benjamin Agosto

Luge
World Cup in Innsbruck–Igls, Austria:
Doubles: (1) Gerhard Plankensteiner / Oswald Haselrieder  (2) Andreas Linger / Wolfgang Linger  (3) Markus Schiegl / Tobias Schiegl

Nordic combined
World Cup in Kuusamo, Finland:
10 km Gundersen: (1) Ronny Ackermann  (2) Janne Ryynänen  (3) Anssi Koivuranta

Short track speed skating
World Cup 3 in Beijing, China:
Ladies' 500m (1): (1) Wang Meng  42.609 WR (2) Liu Qiuhong  43.042 (3) Tatiana Borodulina  43.595
Men's 500m (1): (1) Charles Hamelin  41.118 (2) François-Louis Tremblay  41.273 (3) Wang Hong Yang  42.176
Ladies' 1500m: (1) Jung Eun-Ju  2:25.001 (2) Zhou Yang  2:25.280 (3) Allison Baver  2:26.670
Men's 1500m: (1) Sung Si-Bak  2:27.075 (2) Olivier Jean  2:27.080 (3) Park Jin-Hwan  2:27.184

Ski jumping
World Cup in Kuusamo, Finland:
Individual: (1) Simon Amman  (2) Wolfgang Loitzl   (3) Gregor Schlierenzauer

28 November 2008 (Friday)

American college football
NCAA BCS Top 25:All Times US EST (UTC −5)
The Battle of the Milk Can: (9) Boise State 61, Fresno State 10
The Broncos complete their second 12–0 regular season in three seasons, and keep alive their hopes for a BCS at-large bid. The Broncos win means that #15 Ball State, which also finished its regular season unbeaten, but ranked behind #6 Utah and Boise State, is out of contention for a BCS berth.
Backyard Brawl: (25) Pittsburgh 19, West Virginia 15
The Mountaineers loss means that Cincinnati wins the Big East title and a trip to their first BCS bowl game.
Notable rivalry games:
The Egg Bowl: Ole Miss 45, Mississippi State 0
The Rebels finish 2nd in SEC West Division and 4th in the Conference.
The Battle for the Golden Boot: Arkansas 31, LSU 30 (at Little Rock)
 London Crawford's touchdown catch from Casey Dick on fourth and one with 22 seconds remaining gives the Razorbacks a come-from-behind win over the Bayou Bengals.
Nebraska 40, Colorado 31
The Cornhuskers secure 2nd place in Big 12 North Division, but only 6th in the Conference.

Cricket
Bangladesh in South Africa:
2nd Test in Centurion, day 3:
 250 and 131;  429. South Africa win by an innings and 48 runs and win the 2-match series 2–0.
New Zealand in Australia:
2nd Test in Adelaide, day 1:
 262/6
Sri Lanka in Zimbabwe:
4th ODI in Harare:
 150/8 (47.3 ov) def.  146 (46.3 ov) by 2 wickets (with 15 balls remaining). Sri Lanka lead 5-match series 4–0.
England in India:
The last two One-day internationals were cancelled and the rest of the tour is in doubt, following the terrorist attacks in Mumbai in recent days.

Winter sports

Skeleton
World Cup in Winterberg, Germany:
Men: (1) Florian Grassl  1:54.13 (2) Aleksandr Tretyakov  1:54.16 (3) Martins Dukurs  1:54.42
Women: (1) Anja Huber  1:57.72 (2) Kerstin Szymkowiak  1:57.74 (3) Mellisa Hollingsworth  1:58.38

Ski jumping
World Cup in Kuusamo, Finland:
Teams: (1)  (2)  (3)

27 November 2008 (Thursday)

American football
National Football League Thanksgiving Day games:
Tennessee Titans 47, Detroit Lions 10
The Titans improve their league-best record to 11–1, while the Lions suffer 12th consecutive defeat. Tennessee will secure a playoff berth if the Indianapolis Colts lose at Cleveland on Sunday.
Dallas Cowboys 34, Seattle Seahawks 9
Tony Romo threw for three touchdowns as the Cowboys win the last Thanksgiving Day game at Texas Stadium before they move to Cowboys Stadium next season.
Thursday Night Football:
Philadelphia Eagles 48, Arizona Cardinals 20
Brian Westbrook ties a franchise record with four touchdowns, and the Cardinals still need one more win or a San Francisco loss (possibly at Buffalo on Sunday) to clinch the NFC West division title.
College football:
NCAA BCS Top 10:
Lone Star Showdown: (2) Texas 49, Texas A&M 9
The Longhorns finish the regular season with 11–1 record and keep their hold on the inside track to the Big 12 Championship against Missouri. The 3-way battle for the Big 12 south title depends now on the results of Oklahoma vs Oklahoma State and Texas Tech vs Baylor on Saturday. Texas will clinch the title if the Red Raiders (the only team that beat them) lose, or if the Sooners and Red Raiders both win, and Texas stays above their rivals in the BCS ranking that will be released on Sunday.
In another game:
Alabama State 17, Tuskegee 13
The Tigers' 26-game winning streak, the longest in NCAA football, ends in Montgomery, Alabama to the 2–8 Hornets.

Basketball
Euroleague, week 5:
Group A:
Maccabi Tel Aviv  73–80  Unicaja Málaga
Málaga spoils Pini Gershon's first game as coach of Maccabi
Le Mans  93–98(OT)  Olympiacos
Group B:
Žalgiris Kaunas  60–75  Regal FC Barcelona
Group C:
Union Olimpija Ljubljana  77–69  ALBA Berlin
DKV Joventut  105–100  TAU Cerámica
Lottomatica Roma  76–67  Fenerbahçe Ülker
Group D:
AJ Milano  77–73  Panionios

Cricket
Bangladesh in South Africa:
2nd Test in Centurion, day 2
 250;  357/5 (Ashwell Prince 115*, Mark Boucher 102*). South Africa lead by 107 runs with 5 wickets remaining in the 1st innings

Football (soccer)
UEFA Cup group stage, matchday 3:(teams in bold advance to last-32 round, teams with strike are eliminated)
Group A:
Schalke 04  0–2  Manchester City
Paris Saint-Germain  2–2  Racing Santander
Group B:
Galatasaray  0–1  Metalist Kharkiv
Olympiacos  5–1  Benfica
Group C:
Partizan  0–1  Standard Liège
Sampdoria  1–1  Stuttgart
Group D:
NEC Nijmegen  0–1  Tottenham Hotspur
Dinamo Zagreb  0–1  Spartak Moscow
Group E:
Portsmouth  2–2  Milan
Braga  2–3  Wolfsburg
Group F:
Žilina  0–0  Slavia Prague
Hamburg  0–1  Ajax
Group G:
Club Brugge  1–1  Saint-Étienne
Rosenborg  0–4  Valencia
Group H:
CSKA Moscow  2–1  Lech Poznań
Deportivo  3–0  Feyenoord
U-20 Women's World Cup in Chile:(All times UTC; teams in bold advance to the quarterfinals)
Group D:
 5–1 
 0–3 
Defending champion North Korea and bronze winner Brazil easily advance to the quarterfinals.
Group C:
 2–1 
 3–1

26 November 2008 (Wednesday)

Basketball
Euroleague, week 5:(All times CET)
Group A:
Cibona Zagreb  82–79(OT)  Air Avellino
Group B:
Asseco Prokom Sopot  60–67  Panathinaikos Athens
Montepaschi Siena  86–63  SLUC Nancy
Group D:
Efes Pilsen  81–95  Real Madrid
Partizan Belgrade  62–63  CSKA Moscow
CSKA extends its winning streak to 5–0

Cricket
Bangladesh in South Africa:
2nd Test in Centurion, day 1:
 250;  20/1. South Africa trail by 230 runs with 9 wickets remaining in the 1st innings.
England in India:
5th ODI in Cuttack:
 273/4 (43.4 ov) def.  270/4 (50 ov) by 6 wickets. India lead 7-match series 5–0

Football (soccer)
UEFA Champions League group stage, matchday 5:(teams in bold advance to last-16 stage, teams in bold italic secure first place, teams in italics go into last-32 stage of UEFA Cup; teams with strike are eliminated from all European competitions)
Group A:
Bordeaux  1–1  Chelsea
CFR Cluj  1–3  Roma
Group B:
Internazionale  0–1  Panathinaikos
Anorthosis  2–2  Werder Bremen
Anorthosis extends its unbeaten home streak in all competitions to 40 matches
Group C:
Shakhtar Donetsk  5–0  Basel
Jádson scores a hat-trick for Shakhtar and Basel concede 0–5 defeat for the second time in 3 matches.
Sporting CP  2–5  Barcelona
Group D:
Atlético Madrid  2–1  PSV Eindhoven
Liverpool  1–0  Marseille
U-20 Women's World Cup in Chile:
Group B:
 0–2 
 1–3 
China, runner-up in the last two U-20 World Cup, is eliminated despite their win over USA, which stops the Americans' unbeaten streak in group matches at 11.
Group A: (teams in bold advance to the quarterfinals)
 2–0 
 1–1 
Toni Duggan scores England's equalizing goal 4 minutes into injury time and sends the Young Lionesses to meet USA in the quarterfinal
Copa Sudamericana final, first leg:
Estudiantes  0–1  Internacional

25 November 2008 (Tuesday)

American football
College football:
NCAA BCS Top 25:
(15) Ball State 45, Western Michigan 22
 The Cardinals complete a 12–0 regular season and claim the MAC West division title. Their next game is the MAC Championship Game against Buffalo in Detroit on December 5.
NFL news:
 Former Atlanta Falcons quarterback Michael Vick, currently serving a 23-month sentence in federal prison for his dogfighting activities, pleads guilty to related Virginia state charges and receives a three-year suspended sentence. The plea deal will potentially allow him to leave federal prison early and speed a possible return to the NFL.

Basketball
 U.S. college basketball news:
 The NCAA announces that Indiana will be placed on three years' probation and lose one scholarship, but will not be barred from postseason play. Former Hoosiers head coach Kelvin Sampson is hit with a 5-year show-cause order, which effectively bars him from college coaching until 2013.

Chess
38th Chess Olympiad in Dresden, Germany:
Open: (1)  (2)  (3) 
Women: (1)  (2)  (3)

Football (soccer)
UEFA Champions League group stage, matchday 5:(teams in bold advance to last-16 stage, teams in bold italic secure first place, teams in italics go into last-32 stage of UEFA Cup; teams with strike are eliminated from all European competitions)
Group E:
Villarreal  0–0  Manchester United
Aalborg BK  2–1  Celtic
Group F:
Bayern  3–0  Steaua
Fiorentina  1–2  Lyon
Group G:
Fenerbahçe  1–2  Porto
Arsenal  1–0  Dynamo Kyiv
Group H:
Zenit St. Petersburg  0–0  Juventus
BATE Borisov  0–1  Real Madrid

24 November 2008 (Monday)

American football
National Football League Week 12 Monday Night Football:
New Orleans Saints 51, Green Bay Packers 29
Deuce McAllister broke the Saints' franchise record for most career touchdowns and the Saints tied their franchise high in points scored in a game.

Basketball
NBA News:
The Washington Wizards sack head coach Eddie Jordan and name Ed Tapscott as interim coach.
Euroleague news:
Maccabi Tel Aviv sack coach Effi Birnbaum and name Pini Gershon as his replacement. Gerson's previous spells at the club (1998–2001 & 2003–2006) were the most successful in its history, in which Maccabi won the European title 3 times and was runner up twice. He is also famed as one of only 2 coaches who won the Israeli championship with a club other than Maccabi (Hapoel Galil Elyon, 1993) in the last 39 years.

Cricket
Sri Lanka in Zimbabwe:
3rd ODI in Harare
 171/7 (28/28 ov) def.  166/7 (28/28 ov) by 5 runs. Sri Lanka take unassailable 3–0 lead in 5-match series

23 November 2008 (Sunday)

American football
National Football League Week 12:
Buffalo Bills 54, Kansas City Chiefs 31
Trent Edwards passes for two touchdowns and runs for another pair, and the Bills score the most points ever against the Chiefs, who lose their 19th game of the last 20.
Chicago Bears 27, St. Louis Rams 3
Houston Texans 16, Cleveland Browns 6
The Texans end an eight-game road losing streak.
Minnesota Vikings 30, Jacksonville Jaguars 12
The Vikings capitalize on two early Jaguar turnovers.
New England Patriots 48, Miami Dolphins 28
Matt Cassel passes to Randy Moss for three TDs as the Pats rally from 21–17 down in the third quarter.
New York Jets 34, Tennessee Titans 13
Brett Favre passes for two touchdowns, and Leon Washington runs for another two, as the Jets end the Titans' unbeaten streak at ten.
Baltimore Ravens 36, Philadelphia Eagles 7
Eagles QB Donovan McNabb is benched at halftime, and Ed Reed scores on an NFL-record 108-yard interception return off McNabb's replacement Kevin Kolb.
Dallas Cowboys 35, San Francisco 49ers 22
Terrell Owens catches seven passes for a season-high 213 yards and a touchdown against the team that drafted him.
Tampa Bay Buccaneers 38, Detroit Lions 20
The Bucs come back from a 17-point deficit with 35 consecutive points to keep the Lions winless in 11 games.
Oakland Raiders 31, Denver Broncos 10
The Raiders score their first offensive touchdowns in nearly three games thanks to Darren McFadden.
Atlanta Falcons 45, Carolina Panthers 28
Michael Turner runs for four scores, including three in the fourth quarter for the Falcons.
New York Giants 37, Arizona Cardinals 29
Eli Manning passes for three touchdowns as the Giants improve to 10–1, denying the Cards from securing the NFC West division title.
Washington Redskins 20, Seattle Seahawks 17
Indianapolis Colts 23, San Diego Chargers 20
Adam Vinatieri's 51-yard walk-off field goal wins the game for the Colts.
 College football news:
 Longtime Penn State coach Joe Paterno undergoes hip replacement surgery today. He is expected to resume coaching on December 1 in early preparations for the Rose Bowl.

Auto racing
V8 Supercar:
Falken Tasmania Challenge in Launceston, Tasmania, Australia:
(1) Jamie Whincup 292 (2) Todd Kelly 272 (3) Craig Lowndes 252
Standing (one race remaining): (1) Jamie Whincup 3208 (2) Mark Winterbottom 2975 (3) Garth Tander 2788
A1 Grand Prix:
Grand Prix of Nations, Malaysia in Sepang, Malaysia:
Sprint Race: (1)  Neel Jani (2)  Loïc Duval (3)  Earl Bamber
Feature Race: (1)  Adam Carroll (2)  Filipe Albuquerque (3)  Marco Andretti

Canadian football
96th Grey Cup at Olympic Stadium, Montréal, Québec:
Calgary Stampeders 22, Montréal Alouettes 14

Cricket
New Zealand in Australia:
1st Test in Brisbane, day 4:
 (214 & 268) def.  (156 & 177) by 149 runs. Australia lead 2-match series 1–0.
England in India:
4th ODI in Jamshedpur:
 166/4 (22/22 ov) def.  178/8 (22/22 ov) by 16 runs (D/L method). India takes unassailable 4–0 lead in 7-match series

Football (Soccer)
MLS Cup 2008 at Carson, California
Columbus Crew  3–1  New York Red Bulls
The Crew win their first league championship, becoming the first team since the LA Galaxy in 2002 to win the Supporters Shield (best overall record) and the MLS Cup in the same season. Guillermo Barros Schelotto, who assisted on all three Crew goals, is named the game's MVP.
U-20 Women's World Cup in Chile:(teams in bold advance to the quarterfinals)
Group C:
 1–2 
 4–0 
Group D:
 3–2 
 0–5

Golf
European Tour:
UBS Hong Kong Open in Hong Kong, China:
Winner:  Lin Wen-tang 265 (−15)PO
LPGA Tour:
LPGA Playoffs at The ADT in West Palm Beach, Florida
 Jiyai Shin  wins the US$1 million first prize by one shot over Karrie Webb .

Rugby union
 The IRB Awards are handed out in London. Major award winners are:
 IRB International Player of the Year: Shane Williams, 
 IRB Coach of the Year: Graham Henry, 
 IRB Team of the Year: 
 IRB Hall of Fame inductees:
 19th century: 1888 New Zealand Natives and team organiser Joe Warbrick; Melrose Club and Ned Haig (inventors of rugby sevens)
 20th century: Jack Kyle (Ireland ), Hugo Porta
 21st century: Philippe Sella

Tennis
Davis Cup Final, day 3:
 1–3  in Mar del Plata, Argentina
Fernando Verdasco  def. José Acasuso  6–3  6–7(3)  4–6  6–3  6–1
5th rubber not played
Spain, without world #1 Rafael Nadal, wins the Cup for the 3rd time in 8 years, and first time on the road, as it inflicts first home loss in 10 years to Argentina, that remain winless in 3 finals.

Winter sports

Cross-country skiing
World Cup in Gällivare, Sweden:
Men's 4x10km: (1)  I 1:30:58.8 (2)  I 1:30:59.0 (3)  1:30:59.8
Women's 4x5km: (1)  I 51:01.5 (2)  51:01.9 (3)  I 51:44.2

Figure skating
ISU Grand Prix:
Cup of Russia in Moscow, Russia:(skaters in bold qualify to Grand Prix Final)
Ice dancing: (1) Jana Khokhlova/Sergei Novitski  187.62 pts (2) Oksana Domnina/Maxim Shabalin  184.66 (3) Meryl Davis/Charlie White  170.61

Speed skating
World Cup 3 in Moscow:
1500 m women: (1) Claudia Pechstein  1:55.96 TR (2) Christine Nesbitt  1:56.40 (3) Kristina Groves  1:56.76
10000 m men: (1) Bob de Jong  12:59.21 TR (2) Håvard Bøkko  13:00.65 (3) Enrico Fabris  13:11.98

22 November 2008 (Saturday)

American college football
NCAA BCS Top 10:
(5) Oklahoma 65, (2) Texas Tech 21
The Red Raiders' hopes of winning the Big 12 South and a possible BCS bid are shot down by the Sooners' offense.
(4) Florida 70, The Citadel 19
The Holy War: (7) Utah 48, (14) Brigham Young 24
The Utes complete a perfect 12–0 regular season and secure a BCS at-large bid.
(8) Penn State 49, (15) Michigan State 18
The Nittany Lions win their 800th game in school history, the Big Ten championship and a trip to the Rose Bowl
(9) Boise State 41, Nevada 34
 The Broncos improve their record to 11–0 and clinch the WAC title.
(10) Ohio State 42, Michigan 10
The Wolverines finish with their worst record in school history at 3–9.
Idle: (1) Alabama, (3) Texas, (6) Southern California.
Notable rivalry games:
The Game: Harvard 10, Yale 0
Tennessee 20, Vanderbilt 10
The Big Game: California 37, Stanford 16
Sweet Sioux Tomahawk: Northwestern 27, Illinois 13
The Wildcats retire the trophy with a win after the NCAA declares it as a symbol of Indian savagery.
The Old Oaken Bucket: Purdue 62, Indiana 10
Retiring Boilermakers coach Joe Tiller goes out a winner in his final game.
Other games:
Ole Miss 31, (18) LSU 13
(19) Cincinnati 28, (20) Pittsburgh 21
 The Bearcats beat the Panthers for the first time ever, and gain the inside track to the Big East title.
NC State 41, (22) North Carolina 10
Florida State 37, (25) Maryland 3
Myron Rolle became a Rhodes Scholar today, and the 'Noles celebrated with an upset of the Terps.
 Syracuse 24, Notre Dame 23
 The Irish lose to a team with eight or more losses in a season for the first time in 102 tries (99–0–2 before today). The Orange's winning TD pass is thrown by Cameron Dantley, son of former Irish basketball great Adrian Dantley.
 Wisconsin 36, Cal Poly SLO 35 (OT)
The Badgers survive the D-I FCS team and an upset on the level of Appalachian State-Michigan a year ago.
(21) Oregon State 19, Arizona 17
The Beavers kick a walk-off field goal to keep their Rose Bowl hopes alive into next week's Civil War against in-state rival Oregon. A win in Corvallis sends the Beavers to Pasadena, as they hold the tiebreaker over Southern California.
 NCAA Division II Playoff:
 Abilene Christian 93, West Texas A&M 68
 The second round playoff game between these two in-state rivals sees the highest combined score by two teams in any NCAA football game since the NCAA began keeping official records in 1937.

Basketball
NBA News:
The Oklahoma City Thunder sack head coach P.J. Carlesimo and names Scott Brooks as interim head coach.

Canadian CIS football
Vanier Cup Final at Hamilton:
(1) Laval Rouge-et-Or 44, (3) Western Ontario Mustangs 21
 The Rouge-et-Or win their fourth Vanier Cup in six years, and become the 12th Canadian university team to finish the season with a perfect record.  Laval receiver Julian Feoli-Gudino is named Vanier Cup MVP.  Hec Crighton Trophy winner Benoit Groulx becomes only the fourth player to win both the trophy and the Vanier Cup in the same year.

Cricket
Bangladesh in South Africa:
1st Test in Bloemfontein, day 4:
 441/9d (122.5 ov) beat  153 (36.4 ov) & 159 (51.5 ov) by an innings and 129 runs. South Africa lead 2-match series 1–0
New Zealand in Australia:
1st Test in Brisbane, day 3:
 214 & 268 (Simon Katich 131*);  156 & 143/6 (Ross Taylor 67*). New Zealand trail by 184 runs with 4 wickets remaining
Sri Lanka in Zimbabwe:
2nd ODI in Harare
 68/1 (17.4 ov) beat  67 (31 ov) by 9 wickets. Sri Lanka lead 5-match series 2–0

Football (soccer)
U-20 Women's World Cup in Chile:(teams in bold advance to the quarterfinals)
Group A:
 1–1 
 3–4 
Group B:
 3–0 
 0–2

Rugby league
Rugby League World Cup Final in Brisbane, Australia:
 20–34 
New Zealand wins the World Cup for the first time, and stops Australia's winning streak at six.

Rugby union
End of year tests:
 32–17  in Tokyo
Japan sweep the 2-match series.
 17–25 Pacific Islanders in Reggio Emilia
The Islanders score their first win of the tour and their first ever win over a Test team, while Italy remain winless in 3 home autumn Tests.
 6–42  in London
The Springboks score their biggest ever win over England, and complete a sweep of their European tour.
Ireland 17–3  in Dublin
 Although Ireland win, Ronan O'Gara's missed conversion of Ireland's only try keeps the Pumas in fourth place in the IRB World Rankings, tentatively placing them in the first seeding group for the 2011 Rugby World Cup.
 41–0  in Aberdeen
Canada is held scoreless for the second time in their European tour, while Scotland score their first win of the end-of-year tests.
 9–29  in Cardiff
Wales lead 9–6 at half time, but the All Blacks pull away in the second half for a comfortable win that continues their 55 years winning streak over the Welsh.
 13–18  in Paris
Frenchman David Skrela misses five penalties and a drop goal, and is also sin-binned five minutes from time, as the Aussies win their 3rd consecutive match in Europe.

Tennis
Davis Cup Final, day 2:
 1–2  in Mar del Plata, Argentina
Feliciano López/Fernando Verdasco  def. David Nalbandian/Agustín Calleri  5–7 7–5 7–6(5) 6–3

Winter sports

Cross-country skiing
World Cup in Gällivare, Sweden:
Men's 15 km freestyle: (1) Marcus Hellner  32min 35.20sec (2) Pietro Piller Cottrer  32:36.60 (3) Petter Northug  32:42.10
Women's 10 km freestyle: (1) Charlotte Kalla  24:07.8 (2) Marit Bjørgen  24:32.2 (3) Aino-Kaisa Saarinen  24:39.8
A double victory for Sweden on home snow in the World Cup opening day.

Figure skating
ISU Grand Prix:
Cup of Russia in Moscow, Russia:(skaters in bold qualify to Grand Prix Final)
Men: (1) Brian Joubert  230.78 (2) Tomáš Verner  222.94 (3) Alban Preaubert  219.08  4. Jeremy Abbott  217.48
Ladies: (1) Carolina Kostner   170.72 (2) Rachael Flatt  166.06  (3) Fumie Suguri  162.04
Pairs: (1) Dan Zhang / Hao Zhang  177.42 (2) Yuko Kawaguchi / Alexander Smirnov  169.27 (3) Tatiana Volosozhar / Stanislav Morozov  167.86
Ice dancing (standing after original dance): (1) Oksana Domnina / Maxim Shabalin     97.41 (2) Jana Khokhlova / Sergei Novitski     95.52 (3) Anna Cappelini / Luca Lanotte     86.82

Snowboarding
World Cup in Stockholm, Sweden:
Men's Big Air: (1) Janne Korpi  (2) Chris Soerman  (3) Seppe Smits

Speed skating
World Cup 3 in Moscow:
1500 m men: (1) Håvard Bøkko  1:45.46 TR (2) Mark Tuitert  1:45.81 (3) Enrico Fabris  1:46.00
5000 m women: (1) Claudia Pechstein  6:49.92 TR (2) Martina Sáblíková  6:57.18 (3) Stephanie Beckert  7:01.72

21 November 2008 (Friday)

Cricket
Bangladesh in South Africa:
1st Test in Bloemfontein, day 3:
 441/9d;  153 and 67/3 (f/o) (Mushfiqur Rahim 49). Bangladesh trail by 221 runs with 7 wickets remaining.
 Rain in Bloemfontein means that only 19.2 overs are bowled on the day.
New Zealand in Australia:
1st Test in Brisbane, day 2:
 214 & 131/6 (Simon Katich 67*);  156 (Ross Taylor 40). Australia lead by 189 runs with 4 wickets remaining in the 2nd innings.

Tennis
Davis Cup Final, day 1:
 1–1  in Mar del Plata, Argentina
David Nalbandian  def. David Ferrer  6–3 6–2 6–3
Feliciano López  def. Juan Martín del Potro  4–6 7–6(2) 7–6(4) 6–3

20 November 2008 (Thursday)

American football
National Football League Week 12 Thursday Night Football:
Pittsburgh Steelers 27, Cincinnati Bengals 10
NCAA BCS Top 25:
Georgia Tech 41, (23) Miami (FL) 23

Cricket
Bangladesh in South Africa:
1st Test in Bloemfontein, day 2:
 441/9d (Graeme Smith 157, Hashim Amla 112);  153 and 20/1 (f/o). Bangladesh trail by 268 runs with 9 wickets remaining.
New Zealand in Australia:
1st Test in Brisbane, day 1:
 214 (Michael Clarke 98);  7/0. New Zealand trail by 207 runs with 10 wickets remaining in the 1st innings.
England in India:
3rd ODI in Kanpur:
 198/5 (40/40 ov) def.  240 (48.4/49 ov) by 16 runs (D/L method). India lead 7-match series 3–0
Sri Lanka in Zimbabwe:
1st ODI in Harare:
 130/4 (33.2 ov) def.  127 (31 ov) by 6 wickets (with 100 balls remaining). Sri Lanka lead 5-match series 1–0

Football (soccer)
U-20 Women's World Cup in Chile:
Group C:
 0–2 
 0–5 
Group D:
 1–2 
 3–2 
Copa Sudamericana semifinal, second leg:(first leg score in parentheses)
Estudiantes  1(1)–0(1)  Argentinos Juniors

19 November 2008 (Wednesday)

American football
College football: NCAA BCS Top 25
(17) Ball State 31, Central Michigan 24
The Cardinals survive a scare in a snowy Mount Pleasant to extend their unbeaten record to 11–0 and keep their slim BCS hopes alive.
NFL news:
 After completing an alcohol treatment program, Dallas Cowboys cornerback Adam Jones is reinstated by the league. He can practice immediately, but will not play until the Cowboys' December 7 game at the Pittsburgh Steelers.

Baseball
 The Seattle Mariners name Don Wakamatsu, previously bench coach of the Oakland Athletics, as their new manager. Wakamatsu will be the first Asian American ever to manage in Major League Baseball.
Mike Mussina will retire rather than re-sign with the New York Yankees or any other team.  Mussina won 20 games in the  season at the age of 39, becoming the oldest pitcher to have his first 20-plus win season in MLB history.

Cricket
Bangladesh in South Africa:
1st Test in Bloemfontein, day 1:
 299/1 (81.0 ov); Graeme Smith 138 not out, Hashim Amla 103 not out

Football (soccer)
2010 FIFA World Cup qualification (UEFA):
Group 3:  0–3 
Czech Republic goes to second place on 7 points, ahead of Poland and Slovenia on goals difference. Slovakia lead the group on 9 points.
2010 FIFA World Cup qualification (CONCACAF) Third Round, matchday 6:(teams in boldface advance to fourth round)
Group 1:
 2–0 
 3–0 
Group 2:
 3–0 
 1–0 
Despite their loss, Mexico qualify by goals-difference advantage over Jamaica
Group 3:
 1–1 
 1–3 
2010 FIFA World Cup qualification (AFC) Fourth Round, matchday 4:
Group A:
 0–1 
Marco Bresciano's goal in injury time extends Australia's record to 3 wins in as many matches.
 0–3 
Japan strengthens its hold on second place, with 7 points from 3 matches.
Group B:
 1–1 
 0–2 
Korea lead the group with 7 points from 3 matches, followed by Iran on 5 points.
2010 FIFA World Cup qualification (OFC):
 0–2  in Lautoka
New Zealand had already won the Oceanian Zone qualifying section and will play-off against the side who finish fifth in Asian Zone for a place at 2010 FIFA World Cup.
Friendly internationals (selected):
 1–1 
Italy's coach Marcello Lippi ties the longest unbeaten streak of a national team coach at 31 matches.
 3–1 
 1–2 
 0–0 
 0–1 
Diego Maradona makes a successful debut as coach of Argentina.
 3–0 
David Villa's 12th international goal of the year helps Spain to extend its winning streak to 8 matches and unbeaten streak to 28 matches. Spain won 15 of 16 matches in 2008, the only exception being a 0–0 draw against Italy in Euro 2008 quarterfinal, which the Spaniards eventually won on penalty shootout
 6–2 
Luís Fabiano scores a hat-trick for Brazil.
 0–2 
U-20 Women's World Cup in Chile:
Group A:
 2–3 
 0–2 
Group B:
 0–0 
 0–3 
Copa Sudamericana semifinal, second leg:(first leg score in parentheses)
Internacional  4(2)–0(0)  Guadalajara

18 November 2008 (Tuesday)

American football
 ESPN and the Bowl Championship Series announce that the network will have an exclusive deal to broadcast the Fiesta, Orange, and Sugar Bowls from 2011 through 2014, plus the BCS Championship Game in 2011 through 2013. The Rose Bowl will continue to be shown on ABC through 2014 under a separate preexisting contract, as will the 2014 BCS Championship Game, which the eponymous stadium will host.

Baseball
Dustin Pedroia of the Boston Red Sox wins the  American League Most Valuable Player Award.

17 November 2008 (Monday)

American football
National Football League Week 11 Monday Night Football:
Cleveland Browns 29, Buffalo Bills 27.

Baseball
 Albert Pujols of the St. Louis Cardinals wins the  National League Most Valuable Player Award.

Cricket
England in India:
2nd ODI in Indore:
 292/9 (50 overs) def.  238 all out (47 overs) by 54 runs. India lead 7-match series 2–0

Golf
Wendy's 3-Tour Challenge in Lake Las Vegas, Henderson, Nevada:
Winners: Fred Funk, Jay Haas, Nick Price (Champions Tour)

16 November 2008 (Sunday)

Alpine Skiing
Men's World Cup:
Slalom in Levi, Finland:
(1)  Jean-Baptiste Grange (2)  Bode Miller (3)  Mario Matt

American football
National Football League Week 11:
New York Giants 30, Baltimore Ravens 10
Green Bay Packers 37, Chicago Bears 3
Denver Broncos 24, Atlanta Falcons 20
Carolina Panthers 31, Detroit Lions 22
Indianapolis Colts 33, Houston Texans 27
Tampa Bay Buccaneers 19, Minnesota Vikings 13
New Orleans Saints 30, Kansas City Chiefs 20
Miami Dolphins 17, Oakland Raiders 15
Cincinnati Bengals 13, Philadelphia Eagles 13 (OT)
 The Bengals' Shayne Graham misses a field goal with seven seconds left in overtime, and the game ends in the first tie in the NFL since November 10, 2002 (Atlanta Falcons and Pittsburgh Steelers).
Arizona Cardinals 26, Seattle Seahawks 20
San Francisco 49ers 35, St. Louis Rams 16
Pittsburgh Steelers 11, San Diego Chargers 10
 Jeff Reed kicks a 32-yard field goal with 15 seconds left for the winning margin. In a bizarre ending, Troy Polamalu apparently recovers a fumble for a Steelers touchdown as time runs out, but the score is overturned on review. Game officials and the NFL admitted the call was incorrect the following day.
Tennessee Titans 24, Jacksonville Jaguars 14
 The Titans fall behind 14–3 at the half, but shut out the Jags the rest of the way to stay unbeaten as Kerry Collins throws for three TDs.
Dallas Cowboys 14, Washington Redskins 10

Auto racing
NASCAR Sprint Cup:
Ford 400 at Homestead, Florida
(1)  Carl Edwards (2)  Kevin Harvick (3)  Jamie McMurray
Final Points Standings: (1)  Jimmie Johnson 6,681 points (2)  Carl Edwards −66 points (3)  Greg Biffle −217 points
 Johnson becomes only the second driver, after Cale Yarborough, to win three consecutive titles in NASCAR's top series.
World Touring Car Championship:
Guia Race at Guia Circuit, Macau
Race 1:(1)  Alain Menu (2)  Andy Priaulx (3)  Yvan Muller
Race 2:(1)  Robert Huff (2)  Yvan Muller (3)  Andy Priaulx
Final Points Standings: (1)  Yvan Muller 114 points (2)  Gabriele Tarquini 88 points (3)  Robert Huff 87 points
Formula 3:
Macau Grand Prix at Guia Circuit, Macau
(1)  Keisuke Kunimoto (2)  Edoardo Mortara (3)  Brendon Hartley

Canadian football
CIS Football Semi-Finals:(CIS top ten rankings in parentheses)
Mitchell Bowl:
(3) Western Ontario Mustangs 28, (5) Saint Mary's Huskies 12
 The Mustangs advance to the Vanier Cup, hoping to avenge a 37–9 drubbing at the hands of Laval in August.  It will be Mustangs coach Greg Marshall's first Vanier Cup appearance.
Uteck Bowl:
 (1) Laval Rouge-et-Or 59, (6) Calgary Dinos 10
 Le Rouge-et-Or advance to their fourth Vanier Cup game in the last six years, after building up a 29–0 lead in the opening quarter and a 49–0 lead in the half.  Laval quarterback Benoît Groulx is named Uteck Bowl MVP.

Cricket
Pakistan vs West Indies ODI Series:
3rd ODI in Abu Dhabi, United Arab Emirates:
 273/6 (50 ov) def.  242 (46.3 ov) by 31 runs. Pakistan win series 3–0

Football (soccer)
CAF Champions League final, second leg in Garoua, Cameroon:
 Cotonsport Garoua  2–2  Al Ahly
 Al-Ahly win 4–2 on aggregate for their sixth title in this competition and punch their ticket to the 2008 FIFA Club World Cup.
U-17 Women's World Cup:(both matches at North Harbour Stadium, North Shore City, New Zealand)
Championship:
  2–1  (aet)
 The North Koreans maintain their unbeaten record in FIFA women's youth competition.
 Third place:
  0–3

Golf
LPGA Tour:
Lorena Ochoa Invitational in Guadalajara, Mexico:
 Angela Stanford  wins her second LPGA title of the year by one shot over Brittany Lang  and Annika Sörenstam .

Rugby league
Rugby League World Cup Semi-Final:
  52–0  in Sydney

Rugby union
End-of-year Tests:
  29–19  in Nagoya

Tennis
ATP Tour:
Tennis Masters Cup in Shanghai, People's Republic of China:
Singles final:  Novak Djokovic def.  Nikolay Davydenko, 6–1, 7–5
Doubles final:  Daniel Nestor /  Nenad Zimonjić def.  Bob Bryan /  Mike Bryan, 7–6(3), 6–2

15 November 2008 (Saturday)

Alpine Skiing
Women's World Cup:
Slalom in Levi, Finland:
(1)  Lindsey Vonn (2)  Maria Pietila-Holmner (3)  Maria Riesch

American college football
NCAA BCS Top 10:
(1) Alabama 32, Mississippi State 7
(3) Texas 35, Kansas 7
This loss, combined with (12) Missouri's 52–21 win over Iowa State, clinches the Big 12 North title for the Tigers ahead of the Border War.
(4) Florida 56, (25) South Carolina 6
(6) Southern California 45, Stanford 23
Despite exacting revenge on the Cardinal for their historic upset last year, the Trojans remain second in the Pac-10 Conference as Oregon State holds the tiebreaker, having beaten the Men of Troy.
(7) Utah 63, San Diego State 14
(8) Penn State 34, Indiana 7
(9) Boise State 45, Idaho 10
(10) Georgia 17, Auburn 13 (The Deep South's Oldest Rivalry)
(2) Texas Tech and (5) Oklahoma are idle.
In other games:
Maryland 17, (16) North Carolina 15
Boston College 27, (19) Florida State 17
After Seminoles head coach Bobby Bowden suspends five of his wide receivers due to a fracas at the FSU Student Union, the 'Noles are overpowered by the Eagles.
(20) LSU 40, Troy 31
In a game rescheduled from September 6 due to Hurricane Gustav, the Bayou Bengals spot the Trojans a 31–3 lead, and roar back with 37 straight unanswered points to win in the greatest comeback in Tigers history.
Houston 70, (23) Tulsa 30
The Cougars blow out the Golden Hurricane and in the process, nearly outscore the men's basketball team, who defeated Western Kentucky, 73–64.
North Carolina State  21, (24) Wake Forest 17
Northwestern 21, Michigan 14
The Wolverines lose their eighth game of the season, a new record.
Notre Dame 27, Navy 21
With a win next week against Syracuse, the Irish will assure themselves of a bowl berth.
Vanderbilt 31, Kentucky 24
 The Commodores become bowl-eligible for the first time since 1982, the longest current bowl drought among BCS conference teams, after having lost 17 consecutive times (including four this season) when a win would have made them eligible.

Auto racing
NASCAR:
Carl Edwards wins the Ford 300, but it was Clint Bowyer winning the Nationwide Series drivers' title by 21 points over Edwards. The Joe Gibbs Racing #20 team with a variety of drivers all season long wins the owners' points championship.

Canadian football
Canadian Football League Division Finals:
Eastern Conference:
Montréal Alouettes 36, Edmonton Eskimos 16
Les Als will now be the home team for next week's 96th Grey Cup...
Western Conference:
Calgary Stampeders 22, BC Lions 18
...where they'll host the Stamps in the final.

Figure skating
ISU Grand Prix:
Trophee Eric Bompard in Paris, France:(skaters in bold qualify to Grand Prix Final)
Men: (1) Patrick Chan   238.09 (2) Takahiko Kozuka   230.78 (3) Alban Préaubert   222.44
Ladies: (1) Joannie Rochette   180.73 (2) Mao Asada   167.59 (3) Caroline Zhang   156.54
Pairs: (1) Aliona Savchenko / Robin Szolkowy   188.50 (2) Maria Mukhortova / Maxim Trankov   170.87 (3) Meagan Duhamel / Craig Buntin   166.63
Ice dancing: (1) Isabelle Delobel / Olivier Schoenfelder   184.81 (2) Federica Faiella / Massimo Scali   179.58 (3) Sinead Kerr / John Kerr   176.96

Football (soccer)
MLS Western Conference Final
Real Salt Lake  0–1  New York Red Bulls
The Red Bulls face the Columbus Crew in MLS Cup 2008 next Sunday in Carson, California.

Mixed Martial Arts
UFC 91 in Las Vegas, Nevada
Brock Lesnar, former WWE champion wins the UFC Heavyweight Championship with a second-round TKO of Randy Couture.

Rugby league
Rugby League World Cup Semi-Final:
  32–22  in Brisbane

Rugby union
End-of-year Tests:
  42–17 Pacific Islanders in Montbéliard
  14–22  in Turin
  14–28  in London
  10–14  in Edinburgh
 Ireland  3–22  in Dublin

14 November 2008 (Friday)

American college football
NCAA BCS Top 25:
(22) Cincinnati 28, Louisville 20

Auto racing
NASCAR
Craftsman Truck Series:
Johnny Benson wins the 2008 series championship by seven points over Ron Hornaday Jr.
News:
In what it cited as a cost-cutting move, triggered by the current economic crisis, NASCAR announces that no testing will be allowed in 2009 at any track that hosts races in any of NASCAR's three national racing series (Sprint Cup, Nationwide Series, Camping World Truck Series).

Cricket
Pakistan vs West Indies ODI Series:
2nd ODI in Abu Dhabi, United Arab Emirates:
 232 (49 ov) def.  208 (48.5 ov) by 24 runs. Pakistan lead 3-match series 2–0
England in India:
1st ODI in Rajkot:
 387/5 (50 overs) def.   229 all out (37.4 overs) by 158 runs

Ice hockey
NHL News:
The Tampa Bay Lightning sack Barry Melrose after 16 games and name Rick Tocchet as interim coach.

Rugby union
End-of-year Tests:
  34–13  in Cardiff

13 November 2008 (Thursday)

American football
National Football League Week 11 Thursday Night Football:
New York Jets 34, New England Patriots 31 (OT)
Jay Feely's 34-yard field goal gives the Jets an overtime victory and first place in the AFC East.
NCAA:
Buffalo 43, Akron 40 (4 OT)
A.J. Princepe's game-winning field goal makes the Bulls bowl eligible for the first time in their D-I FBS history in the last game at Rubber Bowl stadium.

Baseball
Cliff Lee of the Cleveland Indians wins the  American League Cy Young Award.

Basketball
Euroleague, week 4:
Group A: Unicaja Málaga  77–67  Cibona Zagreb
Group A: Olympiacos  84–65  Maccabi Tel Aviv
Group A: Air Avellino  78–73  Le Mans
Group B: Panathinaikos Athens  81–76  Montepaschi Siena
Group B: Regal FC Barcelona  74–62  Asseco Prokom Sopot
Group C: Fenerbahçe Ülker  89–87 (2OT)  Olimpija Ljubljana
Group C: ALBA Berlin  74–72   DKV Joventut
Group D: Panionios  72–67  Partizan Belgrade
Group D: Real Madrid  70–69  AJ Milano
Cibona and Siena suffer their 1st loss, leaving CSKA Moscow the only unbeaten team.

Football (soccer)
U-17 Women's World Cup semifinals in New Zealand:
 2–1 
 1–2 
MLS Eastern Conference Final
Columbus Crew  2–1  Chicago Fire
Eddie Gaven's goal in the 55th minute gives the Crew the Eastern Conference Championship and the right to face Red Bull New York in MLS Cup 2008.

Golf
The Royal and Ancient Golf Club of St Andrews announces that the United States television rights for The Open Championship have been granted to ESPN, beginning in 2010. All four rounds will air exclusively on the cable television network, marking the first time that a men's grand slam championship will air entirely on a network outside over-the-air television.

12 November 2008 (Wednesday)

Auto racing
Dale Earnhardt, Inc. and Chip Ganassi Racing will merge for the 2009 NASCAR Sprint Cup Series season. The new team will be named "Ganassi Earnhardt Racing with Felix Sabates" and field Chevrolets for Martin Truex Jr. (#1 DEI), Aric Almirola (#8 DEI), Juan Pablo Montoya (Ganassi #42) and a fourth car (Ganassi #41) with a driver TBA.

Baseball
 Major League Baseball Manager of the Year winners:
National League: Lou Piniella, Chicago Cubs
American League: Joe Maddon, Tampa Bay Rays.

Basketball
Euroleague, week 4:
Group B: SLUC Nancy  69–64  Žalgiris Kaunas
Group C: TAU Cerámica  90–93  Lottomatica Roma
Group D: CSKA Moscow  90–68  Efes Pilsen
CSKA improves to 4–0, while TAU lose its unbeaten record.

Cricket
Pakistan vs West Indies ODI Series:
1st ODI in Abu Dhabi, United Arab Emirates
 295/6 (49.5 ov) beat  294/9 (50 ov) by 4 wickets
Bangladesh in South Africa:
3rd ODI in East London:
Match abandoned without a ball bowled. South Africa win series 2–0

Football (soccer)
AFC Champions League Final, second leg in Adelaide:
 Adelaide United  0–2  Gamba Osaka
 Gamba win 5–0 on aggregate, becoming the second straight Japanese team to win the competition and thereby advancing to the 2008 FIFA Club World Cup. Adelaide United will also go to the Club World Cup, taking up the J.League place as tournament host vacated by Gamba's Champions League victory.

11 November 2008 (Tuesday)

American college football
NCAA BCS Top 25:
(14) Ball State 31, Miami (OH) 16

Baseball
Tim Lincecum of the San Francisco Giants wins the  National League Cy Young Award.

Poker
2008 World Series of Poker Main Event Final Table at Las Vegas, Nevada

10 November 2008 (Monday)

American football
National Football League Week Ten Monday Night Football:
Arizona Cardinals 29, San Francisco 49ers 24

Baseball
 Major League Baseball Rookie of the Year Award Winners:
National League: Geovany Soto, Chicago Cubs
American League: Evan Longoria, Tampa Bay Rays

Cricket
Australia in India:
4th Test in Nagpur:
 441 (124.5 ov) & 295 (82.4 ov) beat  355 (134.4 ov) & 209 (50.2 ov) by 172 runs. India win the series 2–0 and retains the Border-Gavaskar Trophy

Golf
European Tour:
HSBC Champions in Shanghai, China
 Sergio García  birdies the 72nd hole to force a playoff with Oliver Wilson , and defeats the Englishman on the second playoff hole.

Rugby league
Rugby League World Cup in Australia:
Semi-final qualifier:  30–14  in Gold Coast

9 November 2008 (Sunday)

American football
National Football League Week Ten:
Baltimore Ravens 41, Houston Texans 13
Game rescheduled from September 14 due to Hurricane Ike.
New England Patriots 20, Buffalo Bills 10
Minnesota Vikings 28, Green Bay Packers 27
Jacksonville Jaguars 38, Detroit Lions 14
Atlanta Falcons 34, New Orleans Saints 20
New York Jets 47, St. Louis Rams 3
Miami Dolphins 21, Seattle Seahawks 19
Tennessee Titans 21, Chicago Bears 14
Carolina Panthers 17, Oakland Raiders 6
Indianapolis Colts 24, Pittsburgh Steelers 20
San Diego Chargers 20, Kansas City Chiefs 19
New York Giants 36, Philadelphia Eagles 31
Bye Week: Cincinnati Bengals, Dallas Cowboys, Tampa Bay Buccaneers, Washington Redskins. These were the last byes of the season, as Cincinnati's was originally scheduled for Week Eight, but due to rescheduling with Baltimore, was placed here.

Auto racing
NASCAR Sprint Cup:
Checker O'Reilly Auto Parts 500 at Avondale, Arizona
 (1)  Jimmie Johnson (2)  Kurt Busch (3)  Jamie McMurray
With a 36th-place finish or better (37th by leading a lap, or 39th and lead the most laps), Johnson can win his third straight Sprint Cup Championship next week in Homestead, Florida.

Baseball
Nippon Professional Baseball:
2008 Japan Series:
Game 7 at Tokyo Dome: Saitama Seibu Lions 3, Yomiuri Giants 2. Lions win series 4–3.
 Series MVP: Takayuki Kishi, starting pitcher, Lions

Canadian football
Canadian University Sport conference finals:
Dunsmore Cup: (1) Laval Rouge-et-Or 27, (9) Concordia Stingers 17
The nation's number one program head to their sixth straight national semifinal bowl game on Laval running back Sébastien Lévesque's second half performance.

Cricket
Bangladesh in South Africa:
2nd ODI in Benoni:
 358/4 (50 overs) def.  230 (49.2 overs) by 128 runs. South Africa lead 3-match series 2–0

Curling
Pacific Championships in Naseby, New Zealand:
Men's final: China 8, Japan 5
China and Japan qualify to 2009 World Championship
Men's bronze medal match: New Zealand 7, South Korea 6

Football (soccer)
U-17 Women's World Cup quarterfinals in New Zealand:
 2–2 
England win 5–4 in penalty shootout
 2–4

Golf
PGA Tour:
Children's Miracle Network Classic at the Walt Disney World Resort, Florida
 Davis Love III  shoots 8-under-par 64 to edge out Tommy Gainey  by one shot. This is Love's 20th PGA Tour win, giving him a lifetime exemption on that tour (and on the Champions Tour once he reaches age 50); the only other players active on the PGA Tour with this status are Tiger Woods , Phil Mickelson , and Vijay Singh .
European Tour:
HSBC Champions in Shanghai, China
The fourth round of the opening event of the 2009 season is washed out by rain shortly after the leaders start. Play will resume Monday.
LPGA Tour:
Mizuno Classic in Shima, Mie, Japan
Jiyai Shin  shoots 5-under-par 67 to finish at 201 (−15) to coast to a 6-stroke win, her second of the season.

Ice hockey
2010 Olympics women's qualifying tournament:
Group C in Bad Tölz, Germany:
 3–1 
 1–3 
Slovakia qualify for the 2010 Olympic Games in Vancouver
2010 Olympics women's qualifying tournament:
Group D in Shanghai, China:
 2–1 (OT) 
 2–0 
China qualify for the 2010 Olympic Games in Vancouver

Rugby league
Rugby League World Cup in Australia:(teams in bold advance to the semifinals)
Group A:  46–6  in Townsville
9th Place Playoff:  10–42  in Penrith

Tennis
WTA Tour:
WTA Tour Championships in Doha, Qatar:
Singles final:  Venus Williams def.  Vera Zvonareva, 6–7(5), 6–0, 6–2
Doubles final:  Cara Black /  Liezel Huber def.  Květa Peschke /  Rennae Stubbs, 6–1, 7–5

8 November 2008 (Saturday)

American college football
NCAA BCS Top 10:
(1) Alabama 27, (16) LSU 21 (OT)
Nick Saban leads the Crimson Tide to a win in his return to Death Valley, clinching a spot in the SEC Championship Game.
(2) Texas Tech 56, (9) Oklahoma State 20
Iowa 24, (3) Penn State 23
Daniel Murphy's 31-yard field goal with one second left knocks the Nittany Lions from the unbeaten ranks.
(4) Florida 42, Vanderbilt 14
 Tim Tebow throws for three TDs and runs for two more as the Gators book their date with Alabama in the SEC title game.
(5) Texas 45, Baylor 21
(6) Oklahoma 66, Texas A&M 28
(7) Southern California 17, (21) California 3
(10) Boise State 49, Utah State 14
Other games:
 (11) Ohio State 45, (24) Northwestern 10
 (19) North Carolina 28, (20) Georgia Tech 7
 Cincinnati 26, (25) West Virginia 23 (OT)
 Wyoming 13, Tennessee 7
 The Vols lose their first game since the forced resignation of head coach Phillip Fulmer, rendering them bowl-ineligible. The Vols are now assured of only their second seven-loss season in history.

Auto racing
V8 Supercars:
Desert 400 in Manama, Bahrain:
(1)  Jamie Whincup (2)  Craig Lowndes (3)  Russell Ingall
Standings: (1) Whincup 2916 (2)  Mark Winterbottom 2729 (3)  Garth Tander 2624

Baseball
Nippon Professional Baseball:
2008 Japan Series:
Game 6 at Tokyo Dome: Saitama Seibu Lions 4, Yomiuri Giants 1. Series tied 3–3.

Boxing
 Joe Calzaghe  comes back from being knocked down in the first round to defeat Roy Jones Jr.  by unanimous decision.

Canadian football
Canadian Interuniversity Sport conference finals:(CIS top ten in parentheses)
101st Yates Cup: (3) Western Ontario Mustangs 31, Ottawa Gee-Gees 17
 The defending OUA champions took a 22–7 lead and never looked back.
Loney Bowl: (5) Saint Mary's Huskies 29, St. FX X-Men 27
 X-Men kicker Kyle Chisholm misses the game-tying field goal with three seconds left, though the Huskies do concede the single.
72nd Hardy Cup: (6) Calgary Dinos 44, (8) Simon Fraser Clan 28
 The Dinos avenge a loss to the Clan earlier in the season.  Nevertheless, the Clan become the first team since 2000 to reach the Hardy Cup final after an 0–8 season the previous year.
Canadian Football League conference semifinals:
East Division: Edmonton Eskimos 29, Winnipeg Blue Bombers 21
The Eskies, with their first playoff win in Winnipeg since 1976, become the first team since the present crossover rule was implemented in 1996 to win their crossover semifinal game.  Furthermore, Eskies QB Ricky Ray continues to be undefeated in the postseason since 2002.
West Division: BC Lions 33, Saskatchewan Roughriders 12
The defending Grey Cup champions were knocked off at home, thanks to the superior play of Lions QB Buck Pierce.

Curling
Pacific Championships in Naseby, New Zealand:
Women's final: China 9, South Korea 4
China qualify to 2009 World Championship (Korea also qualify as host)
Women's bronze medal: Japan (losing semifinalist)

Figure skating
ISU Grand Prix:
Cup of China in Beijing, China:(skaters in bold qualify to Grand Prix Final)
Ladies:(1) Kim Yuna   191.75 (2) Miki Ando   170.88 (3) Laura Lepistö   159.42
Ice dancing: (1) Oksana Domnina / Maxim Shabalin   186.77 (2) Tanith Belbin / Benjamin Agosto   186.41 (3) Jana Khokhlova / Sergei Novitski   179.50
Men: (1) Jeremy Abbott   233.44 (2) Stephen Carriere   217.25 (3) Tomáš Verner   205.48

Football (soccer)
U-17 Women's World Cup quarterfinals in New Zealand:
 0–4 
 3–1

Ice hockey
2010 Olympics women's qualifying tournament:
Group C in Bad Tölz, Germany:
 0–1 
 2–7

Rugby league
Rugby League World Cup in Australia:(teams in bold advance to the semifinals)
Group A:  24–36  in Newcastle
7th Place Playoff:  0–48  in Rockhampton

Rugby union
End-of-year Tests:
  20–30  in Padua
  39–13 Pacific Islanders in London
  15–20  in Cardiff
 Ireland 55–0  in Limerick
  6–32  in Edinburgh
  12–6  in Marseille
  43–9  in Sandy, Utah

7 November 2008 (Friday)

Basketball
 NBA:
 Utah Jazz 104, Oklahoma City Thunder 97
 With this victory, longtime Jazz head coach Jerry Sloan becomes the first leader in NBA history to win 1,000 games with a single franchise.

Cricket
Bangladesh in South Africa:
Nov 7: 1st ODI in Potchefstroom
 283/8 (50 overs) def.  222 (44.2 overs) by 61 runs

Figure skating
ISU Grand Prix:
Cup of China in Beijing, China:
Pairs: (1) Zhang Dan / Zhang Hao   182.22 (2) Tatiana Volosozhar / Stanislav Morozov   175.05 (3) Pang Qing / Tong Jian   171.86

Ice hockey
2010 Olympics women's qualifying tournament:
Group D in Shanghai, China:
 3–1 
 3–4

6 November 2008 (Thursday)

American football
National Football League Week Ten Thursday Night Football:
Denver Broncos 34, Cleveland Browns 30
 In his first NFL start, Brady Quinn throws for two touchdowns, but the Browns can't hold on to the lead.
NCAA BCS Top 25:
(8) Utah 13, (12) TCU 10
 The Utes keep their unbeaten season and BCS hopes alive with a last-minute touchdown.
Virginia Tech 23, (23) Maryland 13

Baseball
Nippon Professional Baseball:
2008 Japan Series:
Game 5 at Seibu Dome: Yomiuri Giants 7, Saitama Seibu Lions 3. Giants lead series 3–2.

Basketball
Euroleague, week 3:
Group A: Cibona Zagreb  85–76  Olympiacos
Group A: Maccabi Tel Aviv  82–80 (OT)  Le Mans
Group B: Montepaschi Siena  71–61  Regal FC Barcelona
Group C: DKV Joventut  67–70  Fenerbahçe Ülker
Group C: Olimpija Ljubljana  67–78  Lottomatica Roma
Group D: Real Madrid  54–58  CSKA Moscow
Cibona, Siena, TAU Ceramica and CSKA lead their respective groups with 3–0 record

Football (soccer)
UEFA Cup group stage, matchday 2:
Group A: Racing Santander  1–1  Schalke 04
Group A: Manchester City  3–2  Twente
Group B: Benfica  0–2  Galatasaray
Group B: Metalist Kharkiv  0–0  Hertha BSC
Group C: Stuttgart  2–0  Partizan
Group C: Standard Liège  1–0  Sevilla
Group D: Spartak Moscow  1–2  Udinese
Group D: Tottenham Hotspur  4–0  Dinamo Zagreb
Group E: Milan   1–0  Braga
Group E: Wolfsburg  5–1  Heerenveen
Group F: Ajax  1–0  Žilina
Group F: Slavia Prague  0–1  Aston Villa
Group G: Saint-Étienne  3–0   Rosenborg
Group G: Valencia  1–1  Copenhagen
Group H: Feyenoord  1–3  CSKA Moscow
Group H: Lech Poznań  2–2  Nancy

Ice hockey
2010 Olympics women's qualifying tournament:
Group C in Bad Tölz, Germany:
 6–1 
 0–2 
Group D in Shanghai, China:
 3–2 
 5–0

5 November 2008 (Wednesday)

American college football
NCAA BCS Top 25:
(17) Ball State 45, Northern Illinois 14

Baseball
Nippon Professional Baseball:
2008 Japan Series:
Game 4 at Seibu Dome: Saitama Seibu Lions 5, Yomiuri Giants 0. Series tied 2–2.

Basketball
Euroleague, week 3:
Group A: Air Avellino  72–70  Unicaja Málaga
Group B: Asseco Prokom Sopot  65–60  Žalgiris
Group B: Nancy  70–80  Panathinaikos
Group C: TAU Cerámica  106–65  ALBA Berlin
Group D: Efes Pilsen  69–78  Panionios
Group D: Partizan Belgrade  81–76  AJ Milano

Cricket
Bangladesh in South Africa:
Only T20I in Johannesburg:
 118/7 (14.0 overs) def.  109/8 (14.0 overs) by 12 runs (D/L)

Football (soccer)
AFC Champions League Final, first leg in Osaka:
 Gamba Osaka  3–0  Adelaide United
UEFA Champions League group stage, matchday 4:(teams in bold advance to the last-16 round)
Group E: Aalborg BK  2–2  Villarreal
Group E: Celtic  1–1  Manchester United
Group F: Fiorentina  1–1  Bayern
Group F: Lyon  2–0  Steaua
Group G: Arsenal  0–0  Fenerbahçe
Group G: Dynamo Kyiv  1–2  Porto
Group H: BATE Borisov  0–2  Zenit St. Petersburg
Group H: Real Madrid  0–2  Juventus
U-17 Women's World Cup in New Zealand:(teams in bold advance to the quarterfinals)
Group C:  7–2 
Group C:  1–1 
Group D:  2–2 
Group D:  0–3

Rugby league
Rugby League World Cup in Australia:(teams in bold advance to the qualifying final)
Group B:  18–16  in Gosford
Group C:  34–16  in Sydney

Shooting
2008 ISSF World Cup Final (rifle and pistol) in Bangkok, Thailand – last day winners:
Women's 10 metre air rifle: 
Men's 10 metre air rifle:  (new world record, 703.5)
Women's 10 metre air pistol: 
Men's 10 metre air pistol:

4 November 2008 (Tuesday)

Baseball
Nippon Professional Baseball:
2008 Japan Series:
Game 3 at Seibu Dome: Yomiuri Giants 6, Saitama Seibu Lions 4. Giants lead series 2–1.

Football (soccer)
UEFA Champions League group stage, matchday 4:(teams in bold advance to the last-16 round)
Group A: CFR Cluj  1–2   Bordeaux
Group A: Roma  3–1  Chelsea
Group B: Anorthosis  3–3  Internazionale
Group B: Werder Bremen  0–3  Panathinaikos
Group C: Sporting CP  1–0  Shakhtar Donetsk
Group C: Barcelona  1–1  Basel
Group D: Liverpool  1–1  Atlético Madrid
Group D: Marseille  3–0  PSV Eindhoven
U-17 Women's World Cup in New Zealand:(teams in bold advance to the quarterfinals)
Group A:  3–1 
Group A:  0–0 
Group B:  1–0 
Group B:  1–1 
 Diego Maradona is appointed as the new head coach of the Argentina national football team, and appoints Javier Mascherano as new team captain. (BBC), (CNN)

Shooting
2008 ISSF World Cup Final (rifle and pistol) in Bangkok, Thailand – second day winners:
Men's 25 metre rapid fire pistol: 
Women's 50 metre rifle three positions: 
Men's 50 metre rifle three positions:

3 November 2008 (Monday)

American football
National Football League Monday Night Football Week Nine:
Pittsburgh Steelers 23, Washington Redskins 6
NCAA News:
Tennessee head coach Phillip Fulmer is forced to resign, effective upon the end of the season.

Basketball
NBA News:
The Denver Nuggets trade guard Allen Iverson to the Detroit Pistons in exchange for guard Chauncey Billups, guard/forward Antonio McDyess and center Cheikh Samb.

Shooting
2008 ISSF World Cup Final (rifle and pistol) in Bangkok, Thailand – first day winners:
Men's 50 metre rifle prone: 
Men's 50 metre pistol: 
Women's 25 metre pistol:

2 November 2008 (Sunday)

American football
National Football League Week Nine:
Arizona Cardinals 34, St. Louis Rams 13
Baltimore Ravens 37, Cleveland Browns 27
Chicago Bears 27, Detroit Lions 23
Tennessee Titans 19, Green Bay Packers 16 (OT)
Minnesota Vikings 28, Houston Texans 21
Cincinnati Bengals 21, Jacksonville Jaguars 19
New York Jets 26, Buffalo Bills 17
Tampa Bay Buccaneers 30, Kansas City Chiefs 27 (OT)
Miami Dolphins 26, Denver Broncos 17
Atlanta Falcons 24, Oakland Raiders 0
New York Giants 35, Dallas Cowboys 14
Philadelphia Eagles 26, Seattle Seahawks 7
Indianapolis Colts 18, New England Patriots 15
Bye Week: Carolina Panthers, New Orleans Saints, San Diego Chargers, San Francisco 49ers.

Athletics (track and field)

New York City Marathon:
Men: (1)  Marilson Gomes dos Santos 2:08:43 (2)  Abderrahim Goumri (3)  Daniel Rono
Women: (1)  Paula Radcliffe 2:23:56 (2)  Ludmila Petrova (3)  Kara Goucher

Auto racing
Formula One:
Brazilian Grand Prix in São Paulo:
(1)  Felipe Massa (2)  Fernando Alonso (3)  Kimi Räikkönen
 Lewis Hamilton, who finishes in fifth place, wins the drivers' championship by one point over Massa, and becomes the youngest ever Formula One champion. With two laps remaining, Hamilton is passed by Sebastian Vettel and goes down to 6th place, but in the last corner of the track he overtakes Timo Glock and wins the title.
Final standings:
Drivers: (1) Hamilton 98 (2) Massa 97 (3) Räikkönen 75
Constructors: (1)  Ferrari 172 (2)  McLaren–Mercedes 151 (3)  BMW Sauber 135
Sprint Cup Series:
Dickies 500 at Fort Worth, Texas:
(1)  Carl Edwards (2)  Jeff Gordon (3)  Jamie McMurray
WRC:
Rally Japan:
(1)  Mikko Hirvonen (2)  Jari-Matti Latvala (3)  Sébastien Loeb
Drivers' standings: (1) Loeb 112 (2) Hirvonen 102 (3)  Dani Sordo 59
Sébastien Loeb secures the World Championship with one race remaining.

Baseball
Nippon Professional Baseball:
2008 Japan Series:
Game 2 at Tokyo Dome: Yomiuri Giants 3, Saitama Seibu Lions 2. Series tied 1–1.

Canadian football
CIS football conference semifinals:
Canada West:
 (6) Calgary Dinos 24, Regina Rams 17

Cricket
Australia in India:
3rd Test in New Delhi, day 5:
 613/7d (161 ov) & 208/5d (77.3 ov);  577 (179.3 ov) & 31/0 (8 ov) – Match drawn. India lead 4-match series 1–0.
Kenya in South Africa:
2nd ODI in Kimberley
 224/3 (35.3 ov) def.  222/9 (50 ov) by 7 wickets. South Africa win series 2–0.
ICC Intercontinental Cup Final in Port Elizabeth, South Africa, day 4:
 195 (73.3 ov) & 201/1 (58 ov) def.  250 (94.3 ov) & 145 (62.3 ov) by 9 wickets

Figure skating
ISU Grand Prix:
Skate Canada International in Ottawa, Ontario, Canada:
Ice dancing: (1) Meryl Davis/Charlie White  178.89 (2) Vanessa Crone/Paul Poirier  162.13 (3) Nathalie Péchalat/Fabian Bourzat  159.06

Football (soccer)
CAF Champions League final, first leg in Cairo:
Al Ahly  2–0  Cotonsport Garoua
U-17 Women's World Cup in New Zealand(teams in bold advance to the quarter finals)
Group C:  1–3 
Group C:  7–1 
Group D:  0–1 
Group D:  1–2 
Russian Premier League:
Rubin Kazan secures its first ever championship with 3 matches remaining after 2:1 win at Saturn Moscow Oblast.

Golf
PGA Tour:
Ginn sur Mer Classic in Palm Coast, Florida:
Winner:  Ryan Palmer
European Tour:
Volvo Masters at Valderrama Golf Club, Sotogrande, Spain:
 Søren Kjeldsen shoots even-par 71 to complete a wire-to-wire win, finishing two shots ahead of the field at 276 (−8).
Robert Karlsson  becomes the first Swede ever to win the Tour's Order of Merit. This is the last year for the Order of Merit, which will be replaced for the 2009 season by the Race to Dubai.
LPGA Tour:
Hana Bank-KOLON Championship:
Winner:  Candie Kung

Motorcycle racing
Superbike:
Portimão Superbike World Championship round in Portimão, Portugal:
Race 1: (1)  Troy Bayliss (2)  Carlos Checa (3)  Troy Corser
Race 2: (1)  Troy Bayliss (2)  Michel Fabrizio (3)  Leon Haslam
Final standings:
Riders' standings: (1)  Bayliss 460 (2)  Corser 342 (3)  Noriyuki Haga 327
Manufacturers' standings: (1)  Ducati 578 (2)  Yamaha 487 (3)  Honda 415

Rugby league
Rugby League World Cup in Australia:
Group A:  52–4  in Melbourne
Australia advance to the semifinals

Surfing
ASP World Tour
Hang loose Santa Catarina Pro in Florianópolis, Brazil:
 (1)  Bede Durbidge (2)  Jérémy Florès (3)  Micky Picon (3)  Frederick Patachia

Tennis
ATP Tour:
Paris Masters in Paris, France:
Final:  Jo-Wilfried Tsonga def.  David Nalbandian, 6–3, 4–6, 6–4
WTA Tour:
Bell Challenge in Quebec City, Canada:
Final:  Nadia Petrova def.  Bethanie Mattek 4–6, 6–4, 6–1

1 November 2008 (Saturday)

American college football
NCAA BCS Top 10:
(7) Texas Tech 39, (1) Texas 33
 In front of a record crowd in Lubbock, the Longhorns recover from a 19–0 deficit to take a 33–32 lead with 1:29 left, but with one second remaining Graham Harrell throws to Michael Crabtree for the game-winning touchdown.
(2) Alabama 35, Arkansas State 0
(4) Oklahoma 62, Nebraska 28
(5) Southern California 56, Washington 0
(8) Florida 49, (6) Georgia 10 at Jacksonville (The World's Largest Outdoor Cocktail Party)
(9) Oklahoma State 59, Iowa State 17
(10) Utah 13, New Mexico 10
 (3) Penn State is idle.
In other games:
Georgia Tech 31, (15) Florida State 28
Northwestern 24, (17) Minnesota 17
Arkansas 30, (18) Tulsa 23
The Golden Hurricane suffer their first loss of the season
California 26, (24) Oregon 16
West Virginia 35, (25) Connecticut 13
Purdue 48, Michigan 42
The Wolverines' loss means that their consecutive bowl game appearance streak ends at 33, and also assures the Wolverines (2–7) will have a losing season for the first time since 1967.
Following this weekend, the only remaining teams with unbeaten record are Alabama, Penn State, Texas Tech, Utah, Boise State and #16 Ball State.

Baseball
Nippon Professional Baseball:
2008 Japan Series:
Game 1 at Tokyo Dome: Saitama Seibu Lions 2, Yomiuri Giants 1. Lions lead series 1–0.

Canadian football
CIS football conference semifinals (CIS Top Ten rankings in parentheses):
Ontario:
(3) Western Mustangs 36, (7) Laurier Golden Hawks 28
Ottawa Gee-Gees 23, (2) Queen's Golden Gaels 13
Atlantic:
St. Francis Xavier X-Men 52, Mount Allison Mounties 12
Quebec:
(9) Concordia Stingers 41, Sherbrooke Vert-et-Or 20
(1) Laval Rouge-et-Or 32, (10) Montreal Carabins 7
Canada West:
(8) Simon Fraser Clan 40, (4) Saskatchewan Huskies 30

Cricket
Australia in India:
3rd Test in New Delhi, day 4:
 613/7d & 43/2;  577. India lead by 79 runs with 8 wickets remaining
ICC Intercontinental Cup Final in Port Elizabeth, South Africa, day 3:
 250 & 145;  195 & 134/1. Ireland require another 67 runs with 9 wickets remaining

Figure skating
ISU Grand Prix:
Skate Canada International in Ottawa, Ontario, Canada:
Men: (1) Patrick Chan  215.45 (2) Ryan Bradley  212.75 (3) Evan Lysacek  209.27
Ladies: (1) Joannie Rochette  188.89 (2) Fumie Suguri  163.86 (3) Alissa Czisny  157.92
Pairs: (1) Yuko Kawaguchi/Alexander Smirnov  176.97 (2) Jessica Dubé/Bryce Davison  176.54 (3) Keauna McLaughlin/Rockne Brubaker  161.51

Football (soccer)
U-17 Women's World Cup in New Zealand(teams in bold advance to the quarter finals)
Group A:  1–1 
Group A:  1–2 
Group B:  2–3 
Group B:  1–2

Rugby league
Rugby League World Cup in Australia:
Group A:  48–6  in Gold Coast
Group B:  6–42  in Wollongong

Rugby union
End of year rugby tests:
 19–14  in Hong Kong
 13–21  in Lisbon

References

11